Pizzicato is the first album from Yoko Takahashi, including the hit single Mou Ichido Aitakute, which reached #38 in the Oricon weekly charts, while the album reached #75 and charted for two weeks.

Track listing

References

1992 debut albums
Yoko Takahashi albums